Caladenia bryceana is a species of flowering plant in the orchid family Orchidaceae and is endemic to the south-west of Western Australia. It is a dwarf spider orchid with a single spreading, hairy leaf and a single green to apricot-coloured flower. There are two subspecies differing in the features of the labellum.

Description
Usually, there is only a single pale green to apricot-coloured flower. The labellum is two-tone green and ends in a dark maroon tip, with a dense band of tall calli along the centre of the labellum but ending short of the maroon tip. Flowering occurs from August to October.

Taxonomy and naming
Caladenia bryceana was first formally described by Richard Rogers in 1914 from a specimen collected near Gnowangerup. The description was published in Transactions and Proceedings of the Royal Society of South Australia). The specific epithet (bryceana) honours Frances Bryce MacIntyre.

In 2001, Noel Hoffman and Andrew Brown described two subspecies of C. bryceana in the journal Nuytsia, and the names are accepted by the Australian Plant Census:
 Caladenia bryceana  R.S.Rogers  subsp. bryceana - dwarf spider orchid, has its labellum calli in a continuous band.
 Caladenia bryceana subsp. cracens  Hopper & A.P.Br. - northern dwarf spider orchid, has it calli with a gap, usually in the middle of the band.

Distribution and habitat
This spider orchid grows along watercourses and in winter-west place in two widely disjunct populations in the Esperance Plains, Geraldton Sandplains, Jarrah Forest and Mallee bioregions of south-western Western Australia.

References

bryceana
Endemic orchids of Australia
Orchids of Western Australia
Plants described in 1914